The Sugar Ray Robinson Award (previously known as the Edward J. Neil Trophy) is given to the Boxing Writers Association of America's Fighter of the Year.

History
The BWAA first presented the trophy in 1938. The original purpose of the trophy was to recognize "an individual who did the most for boxing in the previous year." 

The ** mark indicates the boxer was not active in the year he actually won the award. Over time, the award went strictly to the best fighter of each year as decided by the BWAA. The members of the BWAA vote to decide the best boxer each year regardless of weight class or nationality.

The award was previously named for Edward J. Neil, an Associated Press sportswriter and war correspondent who was killed in 1938 while reporting on the Spanish Civil War. The 2009 award was renamed after boxing great Sugar Ray Robinson. The "Fighter of the Year" award is presented with other honors given by the BWAA at an annual awards dinner. 

Starting with the 1990s, the BWAA also began to give an award for "Joe Louis Fighter of the Decade." The winners of this award are listed in a separate section.

Award winners

1930s
 1938 –  Jack Dempsey**
 1939 –  Billy Conn

1940s
 1940 –  Henry Armstrong
 1941 –  Joe Louis
 1942 –  Barney Ross**
 1943 –  Boxers of the Armed Forces
 1944 –  Benny Leonard**
 1945 –  James J. Walker**
 1946 –  Tony Zale
 1947 –  Gus Lesnevich
 1948 –  Ike Williams
 1949 –  Ezzard Charles

1950s
 1950 –  Sugar Ray Robinson
 1951 –  Jersey Joe Walcott
 1952 –  Rocky Marciano
 1953 –  Kid Gavilán
 1954 –  Bobo Olson
 1955 –  Carmen Basilio
 1956 –  Floyd Patterson
 1957 –  Carmen Basilio 
 1958 –  Archie Moore
 1959 –  Ingemar Johansson

1960s
 1960 –  Floyd Patterson 
 1961 –  Gene Fullmer
 1962 –  Dick Tiger
 1963 –  Emile Griffith
 1964 –  Willie Pastrano
 1965 –  Muhammad Ali
 1966 –  Dick Tiger 
 1967 –  Carlos Ortiz
 1968 –  Bob Foster
 1969 –  Joe Frazier

1970s
 1970 –  Ken Buchanan
 1971 –  Joe Frazier 
 1972 –  Carlos Monzón
 1973 –  George Foreman
 1974 –  Muhammad Ali 
 1975 –  Muhammad Ali ,  Joe Frazier 
 1976 –  Howard Davis Jr.,  Leo Randolph,  Sugar Ray Leonard,  Leon Spinks,  Michael Spinks
 1977 –  Ken Norton
 1978 –  Larry Holmes
 1979 –  Sugar Ray Leonard

1980s
 1980 –  Thomas Hearns
 1981 –  Sugar Ray Leonard 
 1982 –  Aaron Pryor
 1983 –  Marvin Hagler
 1984 –  Thomas Hearns 
 1985 –  Marvin Hagler 
 1986 –  Mike Tyson
 1987 –  Julio César Chávez
 1988 –  Mike Tyson 
 1989 –  Pernell Whitaker

1990s
 1990 –  Evander Holyfield
 1991 –  James Toney
 1992 –  Riddick Bowe
 1993 –  Pernell Whitaker 
 1994 –  George Foreman 
 1995 –  Oscar De La Hoya
 1996 –  Evander Holyfield 
 1997 –  Evander Holyfield 
 1998 –  Shane Mosley
 1999 –  Lennox Lewis

2000s
 2000 –  Félix Trinidad
 2001 –  Bernard Hopkins
 2002 –  Vernon Forrest
 2003 –  James Toney 
 2004 –  Glen Johnson
 2005 –  Ricky Hatton
 2006 –  Manny Pacquiao
 2007 –  Floyd Mayweather Jr.
 2008 –  Manny Pacquiao 
 2009 –  Manny Pacquiao

2010s
 2010 –  Sergio Martínez
 2011 –  Andre Ward
 2012 –  Nonito Donaire
 2013 –  Floyd Mayweather Jr. 
 2014 –  Terence Crawford
 2015 –  Floyd Mayweather Jr. 
 2016 –  Carl Frampton
 2017 –  Vasyl Lomachenko
 2018 –  Oleksandr Usyk
 2019 –  Canelo Alvarez

2020s
 2020 –  Teófimo López
 2021 –  Canelo Alvarez 
 2022 –  Dmitry Bivol

Joe Louis Fighter of the Decade
 1990s:  Roy Jones Jr.
 2000s:  Manny Pacquiao
 2010s:  Floyd Mayweather Jr.

See also
The Ring magazine Fighter of the Year
Best Boxer ESPY Award, and its successor Best Fighter ESPY Award

References

External links
List of award winners. Boxing Writers Association of America official website

Boxing awards
Most valuable player awards
Awards established in 1938
1938 establishments in the United States